The 2018 Trafford Metropolitan Borough Council election to elect members of Trafford Metropolitan Borough Council in England took place on 3 May 2018. This was on the same day as other local elections.

One third of the council stood for election, with each successful candidate serving a four-year term of office, expiring in 2022. The Conservative Party held overall control of the council going into the election but lost 5 seats, with Labour holding the larger number of councillors, meaning the council entered a state of no overall control.

After the election, the composition of the council was:

Election Results

Overall election result

Overall result compared with 2016.

Ward Results
Asterisk denotes the sitting councillor.

Altrincham ward

Ashton upon Mersey ward

Bowdon ward

Broadheath ward

Brooklands ward

Bucklow-St. Martins ward

Clifford ward

Davyhulme East ward

Davyhulme West ward

Flixton ward

Gorse Hill ward

Hale Barns ward

Hale Central ward

Longford ward

Priory ward

Sale Moor ward

St. Mary's ward

Stretford ward

Timperley ward

Urmston ward

Village ward

Notes

References

2018 English local elections
2018
2010s in Greater Manchester